Bandpey-e Sharqi District (meaning "Eastern Bandpey District") is a district (bakhsh) in Babol County, Mazandaran Province, Iran. At the 2006 census, its population was 32,522, in 8,243 families.  The District has one city: Galugah.  The District has two rural districts (dehestan): Firuzjah Rural District and Sajjarud Rural District.

References 

Babol County
Districts of Mazandaran Province